Nelloptodes gretae is a species of beetle in the family Ptiliidae. It was described in October 2019 and named after the environmental activist Greta Thunberg. Its long antennae bear a passing resemblance to her braided pigtails.

Description
The beetle is pale yellow and gold, and measures 0.79 millimetres long. It has no eyes or wings, and is distinguishable by a small pit found between where the eyes should go. Usually found in the leaf litter and soil, they feed on fungal hyphae and spores.

Distribution
The newly described species was described from material originally collected in Kenya sometime between 1964 and 1965 by entomologist William C. Brock, who took samples of soil from around East Africa which were stored in the Museum's collections. This species is one of nine within the newly erected genus Nelloptodes from these samples.

See also 
 Craspedotropis gretathunbergae
 List of organisms named after famous people (born 1950–present)

References

Ptiliidae
Beetles of Africa
Insects of Kenya
Greta Thunberg
Beetles described in 2019
Species named after Greta Thunberg